= Brgule, Tuzla =

Village in Bosnia and Herzegovina

Brgule
- Village
- Location within Bosnia and Herzegovina
- Coordinates: 44.5511343°N 18.5654004°E
- Country: Bosnia and Herzegovina
- Entity: Federation of Bosnia and Herzegovina
- Canton: Tuzla
- Municipality: Tuzla

Area
  - Total: 0.80 sq mi (2.07 km^{2})

Population (2013)
  - Total: 138
  - Density: 173/sq mi (66.7/km^{2})
- Time zone: UTC+1 (CET)
  - Summer (DST): UTC+2 (CEST)

Brgule is a village in the municipality of Tuzla, Tuzla Canton, Bosnia and Herzegovina.

== Demographics ==
According to the 2013 census, its population was 138.

Ethnicity in 2013
Ethnicity	Number	Percentage
Croats	127	92.0%
Bosniaks	4	2.9%
Serbs	4	2.9%
other/undeclared	3	2.2%
Total	138	100%
